Vitali Arujau (born June 1, 1999, in Syosset, New York) is an American freestyle and folkstyle wrestler who competes at 57 kilograms. In freestyle, he was the 2021 Pan American Continental champion, the 2020 US National Champion and the 2020 US Olympic Team Trials runner–up, as well as a two-time age-group World Championship silver medalist. As a folkstyle wrestler, Arujau is a 2023 NCAA Division I champion and three-time NCAA All-American as well as a two-time EIWA conference champion out of Cornell University.

Folkstyle career

High school 
Arujau attended Syosset High School in Syosset, New York. He started wrestling in the varsity team as an eighth grader ('13–'14) and placed second in the state tournament that year, after losing to eventual teammate Yianni Diakomihalis in the 99-pounds finals. After his setback in the state finals, he never lost a single match in his high school career and ended up with a 216–1 record and four NYSPHSAA titles. When he was a two-time state champion ('14-'15), Arujau committed to Cornell University and entered the school as a four–time state champion.

College

2018-19 
As a freshman, Arujau started off competing at 133 pounds and went 5–1 before moving down to 125 pounds. After moving down, he compiled 26 wins (17 with bonus points) and 3 more losses. In the post-season, he made his way to the finals of the EIWA Conference Championships, where he lost to Pat Glory in a tight 8–10. As the eight seed at the NCAA's, he defeated his first two opponents via major decision before falling to Northwestern's Sebastian Rivera, the top–seed. He rebounded in the consolation bracket, earning victories over the fourteenth, fourth and second seeds (the latter being Nick Piccininni) before losing once again to Rivera to place fourth and earn All-American honors.

2019-21 
After taking an Olympic redshirt for '19-'20 as a sophomore, Arujau was expected to return to the NCAA in this season and was likely to compete at 133 pounds. However, it was announced on November 13, 2020, that the Ivy League had cancelled all winter sports that season.

2021-22 
Following the combined Olympic/COVID layoff, Arujau returned to the Cornell lineup at 125 pounds (with the exception of his first match of the season, against Stanford). Arujau finished the regular season with a 10–1 record, with his only loss to Pat Glory of Princeton. Arujau avenged that loss later in the season, defeating Glory by major decision, 19–6, in the finals of the EIWA tournament to claim his first EIWA title. At the NCAA tournament, Arujau reached the semifinals, where he met Glory for a third time in 2021-22 - and fifth overall - with Glory taking the rubber match by major decision, 13–5. Arjuau recovered from the loss with a pair of wins in the consolation bracket to finish the tournament in third place.

2022-23 
During the 2022-23 season Arujau went 24-1, including a title at the Cliff Keen Invitational in Las Vegas. He won his second straight EIWA title at the Palestra in Philadelphia, helping the Cornell Big Red to a team title. At the 2023 NCAA Wrestling Championships in Tulsa, Oklahoma, Arujau earned his third All-American honor and won his first national title beating two-time defending champion Roman Bravo-Young of Penn State in the finals, 10-4. In the semifinals, he defeated three-time national finalist Daton Fix of Oklahoma State by major decision, 11-3. At the conclusion of the tournament, he was named Outstanding Wrestler.

Freestyle

Cadet and Junior 
As an age-group level wrestler, Arujau was a two-time World Silver medalist and a UWW and USAW National Champion.

Senior and U23

2018 
Arujau made his senior freestyle debut at the U23 Nationals & World Team Trials in early June. He won all of his eight matches and outscored the opposition 90 points to 5, including technical fall victories over the accomplished wrestlers Roman Bravo-Young and Nick Piccininni. He was then expected to compete at the U23 World Championships, but was forced to pull out.

2019 
He made his return at the US Open in late April. He reached the quarterfinals with a series of victories but was defeated by that year's Pan American Games champion Daton Fix. He reached the bronze medal match with wins over the eight and third seeds but was finally defeated by Zane Richards.

At the end of the year, he competed at the US Nationals of December. He reached the semifinals with three wins (one of them over Nick Suriano) before losing to the heavily decorated and winner of the championship Spencer Lee. In the consolation bracket, he defeated one more opponent and earned the third-place finish after Suriano forfeited the final match.

2020 
Arujau was scheduled to compete at the 20' US Olympic Team Trials on April 4 at State College, Pennsylvania. However, the event was postponed for 2021 along with the Summer Olympics due to the COVID-19 pandemic, leaving all the qualifiers unable to compete. After months of not being able to compete due to the outbreak, Arujau defeated Rutgers' Sammy Alvarez via technical fall in July 25, at the FloWrestling: Dake vs. Chamizo card. He was then slated to wrestle Jack Mueller at the annual Beat The Streets event on September 17. However, he pulled out of the bout 5 days prior and was replaced by Rustam Ampar.

Arujau competed at the US National Championships on October 9–11 as the top–seed. He ran through the 57 kilograms bracket, with notable victories over 2020 ACC champion Jakob Camacho, two–time NCAA Division I All–American Jack Mueller and two–time US age–group Greco-Roman World Team Member Dylan Ragusin.

Arujau represented the Spartan Combat RTC at 57 kilograms in the FloWrestling: RTC Cup on December 4–5. He compiled wins over Jack Mueller, two–time US Open National runner-up and '16 NCAA champion Nahshon Garrett (twice) and '17 NCAA champion Darian Cruz to help the team reach the third–place.

2021 
To start off the year, Arujau defeated Michael Colaiocco by technical fall on January 8, at the SCRTC I. Shortly after, he competed at the Henri Deglane Grand Prix of France on January 17. Arujau suffered his first loss in almost a year when he was downed by 2017 World Championship runner–up Thomas Gilman in the quarterfinals, and then defeated Anvar Suviniitty and Răzvan-Marian Kovacs in the consolation bracket, before suffering his second loss in the bronze–medal match, to '13 Junior World Championship bronze medalist from Georgia Beka Bujiashvili, placing fifth.

On February, he competed at the America's Cup, where after three technical fall wins, he helped Team Bobby Douglas reach third place. Afterwards, he wrestled two matches at the NLWC V, getting the two victories over '17 NCAA DI All–American Sean Russell and four–time All–American Zach Sanders. On March 5, he got a win in a dual meet against the NJRTC.

Arujau then competed rescheduled US Olympic Team Trials from April 2–3 as the third seed, in an attempt to represent the United States at the 2020 Summer Olympics. To make the best–of–three, Arujau had to pass through a loaded bracket, defeating 2019 US National runner–up and 2015 NCAA champion Nathan Tomasello and Pan American Games gold medalist, Junior World Champion and US Open National champion Daton Fix. In the finals, Arujau was defeated twice by Thomas Gilman, earning hard–fought runner–up honors.

As the US Olympic Trials runner–up, Arujau competed at the Pan American Continental Championships on May 30, replacing an injured Thomas Gilman. He racked up three technical falls without getting scored on to become the continental champion and help Team USA reach all 10 medals in freestyle.

Personal life 
Vitali is one of the three sons of the accomplished Russian wrestler Vugar Orujov.

Freestyle record 

! colspan="7"| Senior Freestyle Matches
|-
!  Res.
!  Record
!  Opponent
!  Score
!  Date
!  Event
!  Location
|-
! style=background:white colspan=7 |
|-
|Win
|46–11
|align=left| Giorgi Gegelashvili
|style="font-size:88%"|TF 12–2
|style="font-size:88%" rowspan=4|July 20, 2022
|style="font-size:88%" rowspan=4|2022 Poland Open
|style="text-align:left;font-size:88%;" rowspan=4|
 Warsaw, Poland
|-
|Win
|45–11
|align=left| Wanhao Zou
|style="font-size:88%"|8–2
|-
|Loss
|44–11
|align=left| Andriy Yatsenko
|style="font-size:88%"|6–9
|-
|Win
|44–10
|align=left| Robert Dingashvili
|style="font-size:88%"|11–3
|-
! style=background:white colspan=7 |
|-
|Loss
|43–10
|align=left| Thomas Gilman
|style="font-size:88%"|TF 2–12
|style="font-size:88%" rowspan=2|June 3, 2022
|style="font-size:88%" rowspan=2|2022 Final X: Stillwater
|style="text-align:left;font-size:88%;" rowspan=2| Stillwater, Oklahoma
|-
|Loss
|43–9
|align=left| Thomas Gilman
|style="font-size:88%"|TF 2–14
|-
|Win
|43–8
|align=left| Jakob Camacho
|style="font-size:88%"|TF 13–0
|style="font-size:88%" rowspan=4|May 21–23, 2022
|style="font-size:88%" rowspan=4|2022 US World Team Trials Challenge
|style="text-align:left;font-size:88%;" rowspan=4|
 Coralville, Iowa
|-
|Win
|42–8
|align=left| Jakob Camacho
|style="font-size:88%"|TF 10–0
|-
|Win
|41–8
|align=left| Zane Richards
|style="font-size:88%"|7–0
|-
|Win
|
|align=left| Greg Diakomihalis
|style="font-size:88%"|FF
|-
! style=background:white colspan=7 |
|-
|Win
|40–8
|align=left| Roberto Alejandro Blanco
|style="font-size:88%"|TF 10–0
|style="font-size:88%" rowspan=3|May 30, 2021
|style="font-size:88%" rowspan=3|2021 Pan American Continental Championships
|style="text-align:left;font-size:88%;" rowspan=3| Guatemala City, Guatemala
|-
|Win
|39–8
|align=left| Alexander Fernández
|style="font-size:88%"|TF 11–0
|-
|Win
|38–8
|align=left| Bryan Oliveira
|style="font-size:88%"|TF 10–0
|-
! style=background:white colspan=7 |
|-
|Loss
|37–8
|align=left| Thomas Gilman
|style="font-size:88%"|2–2
|style="font-size:88%" rowspan=4|April 2–3, 2021
|style="font-size:88%" rowspan=4|2020 US Olympic Team Trials
|style="text-align:left;font-size:88%;" rowspan=4| Forth Worth, Texas
|-
|Loss
|37–7
|align=left| Thomas Gilman
|style="font-size:88%"|Fall
|-
|Win
|37–6
|align=left| Daton Fix
|style="font-size:88%"|7–5
|-
|Win
|36–6
|align=left| Nathan Tomasello
|style="font-size:88%"|3–2
|-
|Win
|35–6
|align=left| Guesseppe Rea
|style="font-size:88%"|16–8
|style="font-size:88%"|March 5, 2021
|style="font-size:88%"|The East Coast Clash: NJRTC vs. Spartan Combat RTC
|style="text-align:left;font-size:88%;" |
 Allentown, Pennsylvania
|-
|Win
|34–6
|align=left| Zach Sanders
|style="font-size:88%"|6–0
|style="font-size:88%" rowspan=2|February 23, 2021
|style="font-size:88%" rowspan=2|NLWC V
|style="text-align:left;font-size:88%;" rowspan=2|
 State College, Pennsylvania
|-
|Win
|33–6
|align=left| Sean Russell
|style="font-size:88%"|TF 14–3
|-
! style=background:white colspan=7 | 
|-
|Win
|32–6
|align=left| Frank Perrelli
|style="font-size:88%"|TF 15–5
|style="font-size:88%" rowspan=3|February 10–11, 2021
|style="font-size:88%" rowspan=3|2021 America's Cup
|style="text-align:left;font-size:88%;"rowspan=3|
 Concord, North Carolina
|-
|Win
|31–6
|align=left| Sean Rusell
|style="font-size:88%"|TF 10–0
|-
|Win
|30–6
|align=left| Daniel Deshazer
|style="font-size:88%"|TF 10–0
|-
! style=background:white colspan=7 | 
|-
|Loss
|29–6
|align=left| Beka Bujiashvili
|style="font-size:88%"|13–15
|style="font-size:88%" rowspan=4|January 16, 2021
|style="font-size:88%" rowspan=4|Grand Prix de France Henri Deglane 2021
|style="text-align:left;font-size:88%;" rowspan=4|
 Nice, France
|-
|Win
|29–5
|align=left| Răzvan-Marian Kovacs
|style="font-size:88%"|8–2
|-
|Win
|28–5
|align=left| Anvar Suviniitty
|style="font-size:88%"|TF 11–1
|-
|Loss
|27–5
|align=left| Thomas Gilman
|style="font-size:88%"|2–6
|-
|Win
|27–4
|align=left| Michael Colaiocco
|style="font-size:88%"|TF 11–0
|style="font-size:88%"|January 8, 2021
|style="font-size:88%"|SCRTC I
|style="text-align:left;font-size:88%;" |
 Austin, Texas
|-
! style=background:white colspan=7 |
|-
|Win
|26–4
|align=left| Darian Cruz
|style="font-size:88%"|TF 11–0
|style="font-size:88%" rowspan=4|December 4–5, 2020
|style="font-size:88%" rowspan=4|FloWrestling RTC Cup
|style="text-align:left;font-size:88%;" rowspan=4| Austin, Texas
|-
|Win
|25–4
|align=left| Nahshon Garrett
|style="font-size:88%"|7–5
|-
|Win
|24–4
|align=left| Nahshon Garrett
|style="font-size:88%"|14–9
|-
|Win
|23–4
|align=left| Jack Mueller
|style="font-size:88%"|TF 11–0
|-
! style=background:white colspan=7 |
|-
|Win
|22–4
|align=left| Dylan Ragusin
|style="font-size:88%"|TF 13–3
|style="font-size:88%" rowspan=5|October 10–11, 2020
|style="font-size:88%" rowspan=5|2020 US Senior National Championships
|style="text-align:left;font-size:88%;" rowspan=5|
 Coralville, Iowa
|-
|Win
|21–4
|align=left| Jack Mueller
|style="font-size:88%"|11–6
|-
|Win
|20–4
|align=left| Jakob Camacho
|style="font-size:88%"|TF 11–0
|-
|Win
|19–4
|align=left| Jackson Nielsen
|style="font-size:88%"|TF 10–0
|-
|Win
|18–4
|align=left| Jonathan Gurule
|style="font-size:88%"|TF 11–0
|-
|Win
|17–4
|align=left| Sammy Alvarez
|style="font-size:88%"|TF 16–5
|style="font-size:88%"|July 25, 2020 
|style="font-size:88%"|FloWrestling: Dake vs. Chamizo
|style="text-align:left;font-size:88%;" |
 Austin, Texas
|-
! style=background:white colspan=7 |
|-
|Loss
|16–4
|align=left| Aleksandr Sabanov
|style="font-size:88%"|11–12
|style="font-size:88%"|January 23–26, 2020 
|style="font-size:88%"|Golden Grand Prix Ivan Yarygin 2020
|style="text-align:left;font-size:88%;" |
 Krasnoyarsk, Russia
|-
! style=background:white colspan=7 |
|-
|Win
|16–3
|align=left| Zach Sanders
|style="font-size:88%"|TF 10–0
|style="font-size:88%" rowspan=5|December 20–22, 2019
|style="font-size:88%" rowspan=5|2019 US Senior Nationals – US Olympic Trials Qualifier
|style="text-align:left;font-size:88%;" rowspan=5|
 Fort Worth, Texas
|-
|Loss
|15–3
|align=left| Spencer Lee
|style="font-size:88%"|TF 4–14
|-
|Win
|15–2
|align=left| Nick Suriano
|style="font-size:88%"|2–2
|-
|Win
|14–2
|align=left| Zach Sanders
|style="font-size:88%"|TF 10–0
|-
|Win
|13–2
|align=left| Desmond Moore
|style="font-size:88%"|TF 10–0
|-
! style=background:white colspan=7 | 
|-
|Loss
|12–2
|align=left| Zane Richards
|style="font-size:88%"|2–8
|style="font-size:88%" rowspan=6|April 24–27, 2019 
|style="font-size:88%" rowspan=6|2019 US Open National Championships
|style="text-align:left;font-size:88%;" rowspan=6|
 Las Vegas, Nevada
|-
|Win
|12–1
|align=left| Zach Sanders 
|style="font-size:88%"|TF 11–1
|-
|Win
|11–1
|align=left| Josh Rodriguez 
|style="font-size:88%"|3–2
|-
|Loss
|10–1
|align=left| Daton Fix
|style="font-size:88%"|TF 8–18
|-
|Win
|10–0
|align=left| Jesse Delgado
|style="font-size:88%"|14–10
|-
|Win
|9–0
|align=left| Britain Longmire
|style="font-size:88%"|TF 11–0
|-
! style=background:white colspan=7 |
|-
|Win
|8–0
|align=left| Roman Bravo-Young
|style="font-size:88%"|TF 10–0
|style="font-size:88%" rowspan=8|June 1–3, 2018
|style="font-size:88%" rowspan=8|2018 US U23 World Team Trials
|style="text-align:left;font-size:88%;" rowspan=8|
 Akron, Ohio
|-
|Win
|7–0
|align=left| Roman Bravo-Young
|style="font-size:88%"|TF 15–4
|-
|Win
|6–0
|align=left| Nick Piccininni
|style="font-size:88%"|TF 10–0
|-
|Win
|5–0
|align=left| Joe Nelson
|style="font-size:88%"|TF 10–0
|-
|Win
|4–0
|align=left| Rahsun Lawrence
|style="font-size:88%"|TF 10–0
|-
|Win
|3–0
|align=left| Jeffrey Jokerst
|style="font-size:88%"|TF 11–0
|-
|Win
|2–0
|align=left| Tony DeCesare
|style="font-size:88%"|TF 10–0
|-
|Win
|1–0
|align=left| Warren Stanfield
|style="font-size:88%"|TF 14–1
|-

NCAA record 

! colspan="8"| NCAA Division I Record
|-
!  Res.
!  Record
!  Opponent
!  Score
!  Date
!  Event
|-
|Win
|32–4
|align=left| Jackson DiSario
|style="font-size:88%"|MD 14–3
|style="font-size:88%"|November 20, 2021
|style="font-size:88%"|Stanford - Cornell Dual
|-
! style=background:lighgrey colspan=6 |Start of 2021–2022 Season (sophomore year)
|-
! style=background:lighgrey colspan=6 |End of 2018–2019 Season (freshman year)
|-
! style=background:white colspan=6 | 2019 NCAA Championships 4th at 125 lbs
|-
|Loss
|31–4
|align=left|Sebastian Rivera
|style="font-size:88%"|3-8
|style="font-size:88%" rowspan=7|March 21–23, 2019
|style="font-size:88%" rowspan=7|2019 NCAA Division I National Championships
|-
|Win
|31–3
|align=left|Nick Piccininni
|style="font-size:88%"|5–1
|-
|Win
|30–3
|align=left|Ronnie Bresser
|style="font-size:88%"|8–5
|-
|Win
|29–3
|align=left|Sean Fausz
|style="font-size:88%"|MD 11–3
|-
|Loss
|28–3
|align=left|Sebastian Rivera
|style="font-size:88%"|2–6
|-
|Win
|28–2
|align=left|RayVon Foley
|style="font-size:88%"|MD 12–2
|-
|Win
|27–2
|align=left|Malik Heinselman
|style="font-size:88%"|MD 12–2
|-
! style=background:white colspan=6 | 2019 EIWA Championships  at 125 lbs
|-
|Loss
|26–2
|align=left| Pat Glory
|style="font-size:88%"|8–10
|style="font-size:88%" rowspan=4|March 8–9, 2019
|style="font-size:88%" rowspan=4|2019 EIWA Conference Championships
|-
|Win
|26–1
|align=left| Trey Chalifoux
|style="font-size:88%"|MD 13–1
|-
|Win
|25–1
|align=left| Jakob Campbell
|style="font-size:88%"|TF 19–1
|-
|Win
|24–1
|align=left| Jacob Allen
|style="font-size:88%"|7–4
|-
|Win
|23–1
|align=left| Malik Heinselman
|style="font-size:88%"|6–0
|style="font-size:88% |February 22, 2019
|style="font-size:88%"|Ohio State – Cornell Dual
|-
|Win
|22–1
|align=left| Joe Heilmann
|style="font-size:88%"|MD 17–4
|style="font-size:88% |February 16, 2019
|style="font-size:88%"|Cornell – North Carolina Dual
|-
|Win
|21–1
|align=left| Joey Prata
|style="font-size:88%"|4–2
|style="font-size:88% |February 15, 2019
|style="font-size:88%"|Cornell – Virginia Tech Dual
|-
|Win
|20–1
|align=left| Pat Glory
|style="font-size:88%"|Fall
|style="font-size:88% |February 9, 2019
|style="font-size:88%"|Princeton – Cornell Dual
|-
|Win
|19–1
|align=left| Blair Orr
|style="font-size:88%"|TF 19–4
|style="font-size:88% |February 8, 2019
|style="font-size:88%"|Pennsylvania – Cornell Dual
|-
|Win
|18–1
|align=left| Luke Werner
|style="font-size:88%"|11–4
|style="font-size:88% |February 2, 2019
|style="font-size:88%"|Lock Haven – Cornell Dual
|-
|Win
|17–1
|align=left| Nolan Hellickson
|style="font-size:88%"|MD 20–8
|style="font-size:88%"rowspan=2|January 26, 2019
|style="font-size:88%"|Cornell – Harvard Dual
|-
|Win
|16–1
|align=left| Trey Keeley
|style="font-size:88%"|MD 16–3
|style="font-size:88%"|Cornell – Brown Dual
|-
|Win
|15–1
|align=left| Joe Manchio
|style="font-size:88%"|MD 15–5
|style="font-size:88% |January 19, 2019
|style="font-size:88%"|Cornell – Columbia Dual
|-
|Win
|14–1
|align=left| Luke Resnick
|style="font-size:88%"|MD 18–6
|style="font-size:88% |January 12, 2019
|style="font-size:88%"|Lock Haven – Cornell Dual
|-
|Win
|13–1
|align=left| Dack Punke
|style="font-size:88%"|SV–1 4–2
|style="font-size:88%"rowspan=2|December 30, 2018
|style="font-size:88%"|Cornell – Missouri Dual
|-
|Win
|12–1
|align=left| Liam Cronin
|style="font-size:88%"|MD 10–1
|style="font-size:88%"|Cornell – Indiana Dual
|-
! style=background:white colspan=6 | 2018 South Beach Individual  at 125 lbs
|-
|Win
|11–1
|align=left| Tomas Gutierrez
|style="font-size:88%"|3–2
|style="font-size:88%" rowspan=4|December 29, 2018
|style="font-size:88%" rowspan=4|2018 South Beach Individual
|-
|Win
|10–1
|align=left| Paul Bianchi
|style="font-size:88%"|Fall
|-
|Win
|9–1
|align=left| Tomas Gutierrez
|style="font-size:88%"|TF 16–0
|-
|Win
|8–1
|align=left| Matt Malavsky
|style="font-size:88%"|Fall
|-
|Win
|7–1
|align=left| Cole Verner
|style="font-size:88%"|7–4
|style="font-size:88%"|December 29, 2018
|style="font-size:88%"|Cornell – Wyoming Dual
|-
|Win
|6–1
|align=left| Jacob Schwarm 
|style="font-size:88%"|MD 17–7
|style="font-size:88%"|December 16, 2018
|style="font-size:88%"|Cornell – Northern Iowa Dual
|-
|Win
|5–1
|align=left| Caled Rea
|style="font-size:88%"|MD 17–3
|style="font-size:88%"|November 17, 2018
|style="font-size:88%"|West Virginia – Cornell Dual
|-
|Win
|4–1
|align=left| Joe Nelson
|style="font-size:88%"|TF 22–7
|style="font-size:88%"|November 16, 2018
|style="font-size:88%"|Cornell – Binghamton Dual
|-
! style=background:white colspan=6 | 2018 Jonathan Kaloust Bearcat Open  at 133 lbs
|-
|Loss
|3–1
|align=left| Charles Tucker
|style="font-size:88%"|5–7
|style="font-size:88%" rowspan=4|November 11, 2018
|style="font-size:88%" rowspan=4|2018 Jonathan Kaloust Bearcat Open
|-
|Win
|3–0
|align=left| Hunter Kosco
|style="font-size:88%"|11–5
|-
|Win
|2–0
|align=left| Casey Cobb
|style="font-size:88%"|9–5
|-
|Win
|1–0
|align=left| Jack Davis
|style="font-size:88%"|5–2
|-
! style=background:lighgrey colspan=6 |Start of 2018–2019 Season (freshman year)
|-

Stats 

!  Season
!  Year
!  School
!  Rank
!  Weigh Class
!  Record
!  Win
!  Bonus
|-
|2019
|Freshman
|Cornell University
|#5 (4th)
|125
|31–4
|88.57%
|54.29%
|-
|colspan=5 bgcolor="LIGHTGREY"|Career
|bgcolor="LIGHTGREY"|31–4
|bgcolor="LIGHTGREY"|88.57%
|bgcolor="LIGHTGREY"|54.29%

Collegiate awards and records 

Freshman (18-19)
NCAA Division I All-American (125 lbs)
 EIWA Conference (125 lbs)
Ivy League Rookie of the Year
 Sophomore (21-22)
 NCAA Division I All-American (125 lbs)
 EIWA Conference (125 lbs)
Junior (22-23)
 NCAA Division I  All-American (133 lbs)
 EIWA Conference (133 lbs)
NCAA Tournament Outstanding Wrestler

Freestyle awards and honors

2019
 US Nationals (57 kg)
2018
 US U23 World Team Trials (61 kg)
 US U23 Nationals (61 kg)

References

External links 
 

Living people
American male sport wrestlers
1999 births
Cornell Big Red wrestlers
Sportspeople from Nassau County, New York
People from Syosset, New York
Amateur wrestlers
Pan American Wrestling Championships medalists